Carex bonplandii, Bonpland's sedge, is a tussock-forming species of perennial sedge in the family Cyperaceae. It is native to southern parts of Mexico, parts of Central America and northern parts of South America.

See also
List of Carex species

References

bonplandii
Plants described in 1837
Taxa named by Carl Sigismund Kunth
Flora of Mexico
Flora of Brazil
Flora of Bolivia
Flora of Colombia
Flora of Costa Rica
Flora of Ecuador
Flora of Guatemala
Flora of Panama
Flora of Peru
Flora of Venezuela